Punanai (sometimes spelled Punani) is a small hamlet in Sri Lanka, made famous in 1920 by a man-eating leopard. This is reflected in the book titled "The Man-Eater of Punanai - A Journey of discovery to the jungles of old Ceylon", by Christopher Ondaatje.

References

External links 
 https://web.archive.org/web/20060714024958/http://www.manrecap.com/leopard.html
 Location of Punani - top center of map

Villages in Batticaloa District
Koralaipattu West DS Division